Janet L. Dolgin is an American legal scholar and Jack and Freda Dicker Distinguished Professor of Health Care Law at Hofstra University.

References

Living people
American legal scholars
Hofstra University faculty
Year of birth missing (living people)